Apoptosis is the fifth studio album by American death metal band Allegaeon. Produced by the band's longtime producer Dave Otero, the album was released on April 23, 2019 through Metal Blade Records. This is the first Allegaeon record to feature bassist Brandon Michael and the last to feature drummer Brandon Park.

Loudwire named it one of the 50 best metal albums of 2019.

Musical style
Describing the album, vocalist Riley McShane stated "'Thematically, this record is all about contrast, and the music reflects that perfectly. The vocals are heavier than ever, but there are also more clean sections. The drums are faster than ever but also more dynamic, and the guitar playing is lower and slower than on most previous albums, but also provides long, melodic and beautiful sections throughout.'"

The song "Colors of the Currents" is an instrumental track featuring guitarist Greg Burgess playing classical guitar alongside Christina Sandsengen.

Track listing

Charts

Personnel
Allegaeon
Riley McShane – vocals
Greg Burgess – lead guitar, classical guitar
Michael Stancel – rhythm guitar
Brandon Michael – bass
Brandon Park – drums

References

Allegaeon albums
Metal Blade Records albums
2019 albums